is an uninhabited Japanese island in the Mukojima Islands (formerly known as the Parry Group), the northernmost island group of the Bonin Islands, in the village of Ogasawara, Tokyo Metropolis. The entire island and its surrounding waters form part of Ogasawara National Park, while an area of  including surrounding reefs forms part of the Ogaswara Islands UNESCO World Heritage Site.

Geography

Natural history
The island is a breeding ground for the brown booby (Sula leucogaster) and black-footed albatross (Phoebastria nigripes). Vegetation, including Pandanus boninensis, Lobelia boninensis, and Cirsium boninense, has been recovering since the eradication of goats introduced when the island was inhabited between the 1880s and 1944, and feral once the island was again uninhabited.

Related maps and images

See also

 Bonin greenfinch
 Mukojima white-eye

References

Bonin Islands